Verkhnekirovsky is a rural locality (a village) in Pavlovsky Selsoviet, Nurimanovsky District, Bashkortostan, Russia. The population was 32 as of 2010. There is 1 street.

Geography 
Verkhnekirovsky is located 41 km north of Krasnaya Gorka (the district's administrative centre) by road. Pavlovka is the nearest rural locality.

References 

Rural localities in Nurimanovsky District